Sphodromantis conspicua is a species of praying mantis found in Burkina Faso and Senegal.

See also
African mantis
List of mantis genera and species

References

Conspicua
Mantodea of Africa
Insects of West Africa
Flora of Burkina Faso
Insects described in 1967